Afro-soul is a music genre that has African characteristics of soul music. It has emotional vocals, especially of the lead singer. There is a very strong link between Afro-soul and other genres like Afro-Jazz, Amapiano, and Afrobeats.

Notable musicians
 Miriam Makeba, a Grammy Award-winning South African singer and civil rights activist
 Zahara, the South African recently discovered music prodigy
 Amanda Black, multi award-winning songstress from South Africa
 Simphiwe Dana, praised as "the best thing to happen to Afro-soul music since Miriam Makeba"
 Muma Gee, Nigerian singer
 Scelo Gowane, South African singer 
 Siphokazi, a South African artist
 Les Nubians, the French born sisters who are Afropean music singers
 The Budos Band
 K'naan
 Ginger Johnson
 Doug Kazé, Nigerian singer-songwriter
 Manu Dibango, from Cameroon
 Nomfusi, South African artist
 Lekan Babalola
 Grace Matata, Tanzanian afro-soul singer
Kumbie, Zimbabwean Singer/Songwriter

References 

Soul music genres